Fairfield Township is one of the fourteen townships of Madison County, Ohio, United States.  The 2000 census found 1,333 people in the township.

Geography
Located in the eastern part of the county, it borders the following townships:
Jefferson Township - north
Pleasant Township, Franklin County - east
Darby Township, Pickaway County - southeast
Pleasant Township - south
Oak Run Township - southwest
Union Township - west
Deer Creek Township - northwest corner

The communities of Kiousville and Lilly Chapel are located within the township.

Name and history
It is one of seven Fairfield Townships statewide.

Government
The township is governed by a three-member board of trustees, who are elected in November of odd-numbered years to a four-year term beginning on the following January 1. Two are elected in the year after the presidential election and one is elected in the year before it. There is also an elected township fiscal officer, who serves a four-year term beginning on April 1 of the year after the election, which is held in November of the year before the presidential election. Vacancies in the fiscal officership or on the board of trustees are filled by the remaining trustees.

References

External links
County website

Townships in Madison County, Ohio
Townships in Ohio